Race Point Light is a historic lighthouse on Cape Cod, in Provincetown, Massachusetts; it is on the National Register of Historic Places. The original tower, first illuminated in 1816, was replaced in 1876 with the current 45-foot tall iron-plated tower and a new keeper's dwelling. The American Lighthouse Foundation operates the property and rents out two buildings for overnight stays. The actual light is maintained by the Coast Guard. The site is reached by walking about 45 minutes over sand; with a National Park Service Oversand Permit, a four-wheel-drive vehicle can be used.

History

Race Point Light was first established in 1816, the third light on Cape Cod (after Highland Light (1797) and Chatham Light (1808). The original light was a  rubblestone tower that featured one of the earliest rotating beacons, which distinguished it from others on Cape Cod. In 1858 the light got a fourth order Fresnel lens and, in 1874, a second keeper's quarters.

In 1876, after significant deterioration of the original tower, it was replaced with a 45-foot tall cast iron tower lined with brick. The Fresnel lens was installed into the new tower. The original keeper's stone house was removed and replaced with one made of wood. Race Point Light was electrified in 1957. The larger keeper's house was removed in 1960 and the other was updated.  The light was automated in 1972.

In 1995 the group updated the keeper's house and began offering rooms for overnight stays in 1998. A solar electrical system was installed in October 2003, and a wind turbine back-up generator was added in 2007. The light now uses a solar-powered VRB-25 optic with 400,000 candlepower, operated by the Coast Guard. Operation of the site is by the American Lighthouse Foundation. Tours are available on the first and third Saturdays from June until October. Both the Keeper's House and the Whistle House are available for overnight rental.

Race Point Light was added to the National Register of Historic Places as Race Point Light Station on June 15, 1987, reference number 87001482.

Light keepers
The following keepers maintained the light over the years, some for a surprisingly short time. Several had been assistant keepers for years prior to their promotion to head keeper.

Joshua Dyer (1816 – 1822)
Elijah Dyer (1822 – 1847)
Lemuel Cook (1847 – 1853)
Waterman Crocker (1853 – 1861)
Josiah Ghenn (1861 – 1870)
James Cushman (1870 – 1885)
Thomas V. Mullins (1885 – 1892)
Charles A. Havender (1892 – 1904)
Samuel S. Smith (1904 – 1909)
Roscoe G. Lopaus (1909)
 Waldo Leighton (1909 – 1915)
William H. Lowther (1915 – 1935)
James W. Hinckley (1935 – 1937)
Javan D. York (1938 – 1942)
Theodore M. Koswoski (1944)
James O’Brien (1944)
Joseph L. Collette (1944)
Osborne E. Hallett (1945 – 1955)
Elias J. Martinez (1955 – 1956)
Gottfried Schiffers (1956 – 1958)
Elias J. Martinez (1958 – 1959)
Aubrey T. Griggs (1959 – 1960)

See also
 Cape Cod National Seashore
 Long Point Light
 Wood End Light
 Nauset Light

References

External links

 Race Point Lighthouse, official website, with online reservations
 Race Point Light Station – National Park Service website, featured in Maritime History of Massachusetts — A National Register of Historic Places Travel Itinerary

Lighthouses completed in 1816
Towers completed in 1816
Lighthouses completed in 1876
National Register of Historic Places in Cape Cod National Seashore
Italianate architecture in Massachusetts
Lighthouses on the National Register of Historic Places in Massachusetts
Lighthouses in Barnstable County, Massachusetts
Provincetown, Massachusetts
1816 establishments in Massachusetts